Hill Street is a major north–south thoroughfare in Los Angeles, measuring  in length. It starts on Martin Luther King, Jr. Boulevard near the campus of USC, and passes north through Downtown Los Angeles, past such landmarks as Pershing Square, the Subway Terminal Building, Angels Flight, Fort Moore and Chinatown. Hill Street merges with the Arroyo Seco Parkway near Dodger Stadium.

History

Hill Street was originally laid out in 1849 by Edward Ord. At that time, the street ended in the north at 1st Street, where the foot of Fort Hill sat. The stretch of modern Hill Street north of the old hill was originally named Calle del Toro (Bull Street), was renamed Castelar in 1874, and finally renamed North Hill in 1960.

Transportation
The Metro B Line and Metro D Line run underneath Hill Street between 1st and 4th Streets and operate the Civic Center and Pershing Square stations along the way. Metro Local lines 2, 4, 10, 28, 81, and 94 run along the surface. The Angels Flight funicular climbs west up Bunker Hill from Hill between 3rd and 4th streets.

Education

Number of schools are located at or nearby Hill Street. They include Cathedral High School, Castelar Elementary School, High School for the Visual and Performing Arts, Evans Community Adult School, the William Jefferson Clinton Middle School, Orthopaedic Hospital Medical Magnet High School, Santee Education Complex, and Los Angeles Trade-Tech College.

Los Angeles Public Library has the Chinatown branch located at Hill and Ord Streets.

Landmarks
North of US-101 freeway

 Chinatown Branch Library, Hill and Ord streets
 Ramón C. Cortines School of Visual and Performing Arts (back side)
 Fort Moore Pioneer Memorial (451 N. Hill)
 Site of Los Angeles High School building (1891, razed)

Civic Center

 Cathedral of Our Lady of the Angels (2002, Rafael Moneo, Modern architecture with deconstructivist elements)
Kenneth Hahn Hall of Administration (1960, Stanton, Stockwell, Williams and Wilson, Late Moderne architecture)
Los Angeles County Hall of Records (1962)
 Grand Park
Stanley Mosk Courthouse (1958, Stanton, Stockwell, Williams and Wilson, Late Moderne architecture)
 United States Courthouse (First Street, Los Angeles), opened 2016, built on the site of the demolished First Junipero Serra State Office Building (Stanton & Stockwell, 1960)

Third to Fourth streets
 Angels Flight
 Grand Central Market

Fourth to Fifth streets

 Former Broadway Department Store (back side), now Junipero Serra State Office Building (#2)
Subway Terminal Building , now Metro 417 residential
Title Guarantee and Trust Company Building (1930)
Fifth to Sixth streets:
 Pershing Square
 Pershing Square station
 Site of Paramount Theatre (movie palace), now International Jewelry Center

Sixth to Seventh streets
Consolidated Reatly Bldg./California Jewelry Mart (1908/1935)
Sun Realty Bldg./Los Angeles Jewelry Center (1931)
Harris & Frank Bldg./Wholesale Jewelry Exchange (1925)
Western Jewelry Mart
William Fox Bldg. (Fox Jewelry Plaza) (1932)
 former Warner Bros. (a.k.a. Pantages, Warren) Theatre (movie palace, 1920), now Jewelry Theatre Center
 Bullock's department store buildings (back entrance), now St. Vincent Jewelry Center

Seventh to Eighth streets
Foreman & Clark department store building (site, 1928)
 Garfield Building (1930)
 Union Bank and Trust Company building (1922), now Union Lofts

Eighth to Ninth streets
 Site of the RKO Hillstreet Theatre (1922–1963), now 820 Olive (residential)
Coast Federal Savings Building (1926)

Ninth St. to Olympic Blvd.
 May Company Garage - 1926 - one of the Nation's first parking structures (Los Angeles Historic-Cultural Monument No. 1001)
 South Park by Windsor Apts. 
South of Olympic Blvd.
 The Mayan
 Site of Belasco Theatre
 White Log Coffee Shop
 John Adams Middle School (151 W. 30th St.)

Notes

References

Streets in Los Angeles
Downtown Los Angeles
Chinatown, Los Angeles
Civic Center, Los Angeles